Pegler is an English surname. Notable people with the surname include:

 Alan Pegler (1920–2012), British railway preservationist
 Alice Pegler (1861–1929), South African teacher and botanical collector
 David Pegler (born 1938), British mycologist
 Don Pegler, Australian politician
 Luke Pegler (born 1981), Australian actor
 Sid Pegler (1888–1972), South African cricketer
 Westbrook Pegler (1894–1969), American journalist and writer

See also
 Pegler Yorkshire, a British manufacturer of valves and other engineering products
 Hetty Pegler's Tump, a Neolithic burial mound in Gloucestershire, England

English-language surnames